Bognes is a ferry port in Hamarøy Municipality in Nordland county, Norway. It is located in the outer part of the Tysfjorden on the western side of the fjord.

Ferries operate from Bognes across the Tysfjorden to Skarberget as part of the European route E06 highway. There are also ferries that cross the Vestfjorden to Lødingen as part of the Norwegian National Road 85.

References

Hamarøy
Ferry quays in Nordland